PowerSource, or "hybrid" phones, are specialized cellular devices used by customers of the American telecommunications company Sprint-Nextel.  They are distinct from other mobile phones in that they make use of two cellular networks instead of a single one.

PowerSource phones currently include the ic402, ic502, ic602 and ic902, all manufactured by Motorola and available only through Sprint-Nextel in the United States.

History 
Upon the merger of Sprint PCS and Nextel Communications in 2005, the combined company faced significant integration challenges.  Unlike some other mergers in the wireless arena, Sprint PCS and Nextel employed different air-interface technologies for their networks, making them incompatible.  Sprint used Qualcomm's proprietary CDMA format, which they operated in the 1900 MHz band, while Nextel used Motorola's iDEN system, which they deployed at 800 MHz.  This meant that the combined company had two distinct customer bases with two types of phones; a Nextel user could not use their phone on the Sprint PCS network, and vice versa.

There was an additional problem facing the newly combined company:  prior to the merger, Nextel Communications had been issued a government mandate to reduce interference caused by its cellular network with public safety radio systems.  It was to do so via a process termed "re-banding."  As a side effect of this "re-banding," however, Nextel's iDEN network would lose valuable 800 MHz spectrum, causing the network to face significant capacity challenges.  Simultaneously, Boost Mobile, a prepaid MVNO that operated on Nextel's network, was beginning to skyrocket in popularity, placing an even greater burden on the iDEN system.  This eventually manifested itself in a decrease in Nextel customers' call quality in certain markets—dropped calls, blocked calls, and bad voice quality all began to be reported in various cities in 2006.

To remedy this problem, Sprint-Nextel sought to move as much of its customers' voice traffic (phone call volume) as it could from the Nextel network to the higher-capacity Sprint network.  The challenge that arose then, however, was how to keep the Nextel customer base happy; Nextel had become famous in the United States for its walkie-talkie feature (called Direct Connect), a feature that at the time could not be replicated on the Sprint (or any other) network.
The result was the PowerSource series of phones.  Originally called "hybrids," these devices were aggressively marketed to Nextel customers in so-called "red markets" (areas of high Nextel network congestion) beginning in the fourth quarter of 2006.

Operation 
PowerSource phones used the Sprint network for interconnect (regular voice phone calls) and the Nextel network for walkie-talkie calls.  They do this through the implementation of two radios in each unit—a 1900 MHz CDMA radio for Sprint, and an 800 MHz iDEN radio for Nextel.  Since the more capacity-hungry interconnect (phone) calls are routed through the higher-capacity Sprint network, these phones in mass deployment are expected to reduce the overall burden on the Nextel network.

Since data services (such as web browsing and text messaging) are routed through the Sprint PCS network, they perform faster (up to 144 kbit/s) than on the Nextel National Network (up to 56 kbit/s). Also, since interconnect and walkie-talkie calls use different networks, it is possible to receive a walkie-talkie alert while on a regular voice call—something not possible on a traditional Nextel phone.

Maintaining two active radios in a single handset is a power-intensive task, and some users have complained about lack of battery endurance in the ic402/ic502 models.  Some users report Sprint-Nextel acknowledges the problem and has even offered free car chargers as a result.  Additionally, because Motorola did not include the capability for 800 MHz roaming in the handset, the usable coverage area for a PowerSource phone is significantly less than that of a comparable Sprint PCS phone.  Also, since the PowerSource series does not allow voice calling over the iDEN network, a customer with good Nextel coverage but no Sprint coverage would only be able to use the walkie-talkie feature.

Phone selection was once a stumbling point, with the ic402 and ic502 being the only two models available; both are basic units that lack cameras, high-speed data, or any similar amenities. This shortcoming has now been eliminated with the availability of the ic902, a high-end model, which is the first powersource phone with high-speed 3G data (EVDO), a 2-megapixel camera and an external SD card storage. The ic902 also offers bluetooth and MP3 capabilities. In addition, the ic602 is coming out 9/2/07 and it is described as a Mid Tier Powersource clamshell built to Mil spec 810F with Vision Data services and a VGA camera.

External links 
 Sprint Website
 cNet review of ic502
 PhoneScoop spec sheet of ic502

Sprint Corporation
Mobile phones
Code division multiple access
Motorola